Gordie Bonin (September 30, 1948 – November 29, 2013), along with Ron Hodgson and Gordon Jenner, made up what is considered one of the best Canadian drag racing teams ever. Bonin was nicknamed "240 Gordie".

At the 1978 NHRA Summernationals at Englishtown, Bonin drove the Bubble Up Pontiac Trans Am funny car.

Bonin,  along with his teammates, was inducted into the Canadian Motorsport Hall of Fame in 2000.

References

1948 births
2013 deaths
Racing drivers from Saskatchewan
Dragster drivers